The Government of the Soviet Union (Pravitel'stvo SSSR), formally the All-Union Government of the Union of Soviet Socialist Republics, commonly abbreviated to Soviet Government, was the main executive institution of government in the former Soviet Union. It was led by a chairman, but the office was commonly referred to as Premier of the Soviet Union. The premier was nominated by the Central Committee of the Communist Party of the Soviet Union (CPSU) at the 1st Plenary Session of the Supreme Soviet of the Soviet Union in the aftermath of national elections. Certain governments, such as Ryzhkov's II, had more than 100 other government members, serving as first deputy premiers, deputy premiers, government ministers or heads of state committees/commissions; they were chosen by the premier and confirmed by the Supreme Soviet. The Government of the Soviet Union exercised its executive powers in conformity with the constitution of the Soviet Union and legislation enacted by the Supreme Soviet. The first government was led by Vladimir Lenin, and the last government was led by Ivan Silayev.

Following the Treaty on the Creation of the USSR of 1922, the Russian Soviet Socialist Federative Republic, Ukrainian Socialist Soviet Republic, the Byelorussian Socialist Soviet Republic and the Transcaucasian Socialist Federative Soviet Republic established the Union of Soviet Socialist Republics (USSR). The treaty established the government, which was later legitimised by the adoption of the first Soviet constitution in 1924. The 1924 constitution made the government responsible to the Congress of Soviets of the Soviet Union. In 1936, the state system was reformed with the enactment of a new constitution. It abolished the Congress of Soviets and established the Supreme Soviet of the Soviet Union in its place. At the 1st Plenary Session of the II Supreme Soviet in 1946 the government was renamed Council of Ministers. Minor changes were introduced with the enactment of the 1977 constitution. The CPSU's 19th All-Union Conference voted in favor of amending the constitution. It allowed for multi-candidate elections, established the Congress of People's Deputies and weakened the party's control over the Supreme Soviet. Later on 20 March 1991 the Supreme Soviet on Mikhail Gorbachev's suggestion amended the constitution to establish a presidential system. The Council of Ministers was abolished and replaced by a Cabinet of Ministers that was responsible to the President of the Soviet Union. The head of the Cabinet of Ministers was the Prime Minister of the Soviet Union. The government was forced to resign in the aftermath of the 1991 Soviet coup d'état attempt, in which Prime Minister Valentin Pavlov participated in. In its place the Soviet state established what was supposed to be a transitory committee headed by Silayev to run the basic governmental functions until a new cabinet was appointed. On 26 December 1991 the Supreme Soviet dissolved the Soviet Union and therefore, the government of the Soviet Union.

Governments

Statistics

See also 
 
 
 
 Premier of the Soviet Union

External links 
 Governments of  the Union of Soviet Socialist Republics from 1917–1964 and 1964–1991

 
Soviet Union
Soviet Union